Countess Palatine Claudia Magdalena of Zweibrücken-Birkenfeld-Bischweiler (also known as Magdalena Claudine; 16 September 1668 – 28 November 1704 in Hanau), was the daughter of the Count Palatine Christian II of Palatinate-Birkenfeld-Bischweiler (born: 22 June 1637; died: 26 April 1717).

Issue 
From her marriage with Philip Reinhard, she had the following children:
 Stillbirth (1691), buried in the crypt of the St. John's Church (now called Old St. John's Church) in Hanau
 Stillbirth (1693);
 Catharine Magdalene, buried in the crypt of St John's Church in Hanau

Claudia Magdalena died on 28 November 1704 and on was also buried in the crypt of the Lutheran Church in Hanau, on
18 December 1704. During the mourning, the biggest bell in St. John's Church broke. This was a bell she had donated. The burial site of the Lutheran branch of the House of Hanau - and thus the burial of Countess Claudia Magdalena - was destroyed during the Second World War.

References 
 Reinhard Dietrich: Die Landesverfassung in dem Hanauischen = Hanauer Geschichtsblätter, vol. 34, Hanau, 1996. 
 Rudolf Lenz: Katalog der Leichenpredigten und sonstigen Trauerschriften in der Hessischen Landes- und Hochschulbibliothek Darmstadt = Marburger Personalschriftenforschungen, vol. 11, Sigmaringen, 1990
 Rudolf Lenz: Katalog der Leichenpredigten und sonstigen Trauerschriften in der Universitätsbibliothek Gießen = Marburger Personalschriftenforschungen, vol. 15, Sigmaringen, 1994
 Rudolf Lenz: Katalog der Leichenpredigten und sonstigen Trauerschriften im Hessischen Hauptstaatsarchiv Wiesbaden = Marburger Personalschriftenforschungen, vol. 7,1, Marburg, 1985
 Reinhard Suchier: Genealogie des Hanauer Grafenhauses, in: Festschrift des Hanauer Geschichtsvereins zu seiner fünfzigjährigen Jubelfeier am 27. August 1894, Hanau, 1894
 Reinhard Suchier: Die Grabmonumente und Särge der in Hanau bestatteten Personen aus den Häusern Hanau und Hessen, in: Programm des Königlichen Gymnasiums zu Hanau, Hanau, 1879, p. 1-56.
 Richard Wille: Die letzten Grafen von Hanau-Lichtenberg, in: Mitteilungen des Hanauer Bezirksvereins für hessische Geschichte und Landeskunde, vol. 12, Hanau, 1886, p. 56-68
 Ernst J. Zimmermann: Hanau Stadt und Land, 3rd ed., Hanau, 1919, reprinted: 1978

Footnotes 

House of Wittelsbach
Countesses of Hanau-Münzenberg
1668 births
1704 deaths
17th-century German people
Daughters of monarchs